Jordan Ernest Burroughs (born July 8, 1988) is an American freestyle wrestler and former freestyle wrestler who currently competes at 79 kilograms, and previously competed at 74 kilos. In freestyle, he was the 2012 Olympic gold medalist, is the reigning and a six-time world champion (nine-time medalist), three-time Pan American Games Gold medalist, four-time Pan American champion, and four-time US Open national champion, and has made the US World or Olympic Team on 11 occasions.

In freestyle, Burroughs was a two-time NCAA Division I champion for the Nebraska Cornhuskers and was awarded the Dan Hodge Trophy (equivalent to the Heisman Trophy) in 2012. After winning gold at the 2022 World Wrestling Championships, Burroughs set the American record with his seventh gold medal at the Olympic and World Championship level. Burroughs is widely known for his double-leg takedown and is considered one of the greatest freestyle wrestlers of all time.

Early life 
Burroughs is from the Sicklerville section of Winslow Township, New Jersey. When he was in elementary school, he brought a wrestling flyer home and became the first member of his family to ever wrestle, at the age of five. He went on to attend Winslow Township High School, where he was a three-sport athlete in wrestling, American football, and running. He dreamed of playing in the NFL as a wide receiver, but gave up on it to focus on wrestling, weighing 130 pounds as a freshman.

As a wrestler, he became a three-time district champion, two-time regional champion, state (NJSIAA) champion, and NHSCA national champion in his senior year ('06). He graduated with 115 wins and 20 losses.

College career
In 2006, he accepted a scholarship to the University of Nebraska as the 52nd-ranked senior in the nation.

2006–07 
Burroughs freshman year ended with 16 wins and 13 losses. He was also an NCAA qualifier and placed third at the Big 12 Conference championships.

2007–08 
For his sophomore year in college, he made adjustments with which he finished regular season with a 34–6 record. He also set a single-season record, scoring 98 dual takedowns and surrendering just seven on the year, marking one of UNL's best sophomore seasons. As the top-seed at the Big 12 Championships, Burroughs made his way to the title with technical fall and major decisions and was also named the Outstanding Wrestler of the tournament. At the NCAAs, he capped three victories up until the semifinals, where he was downed by Hawkeyes' legend Brent Metcalf. He placed third after defeating J.P. O'Connor and Josh Churella in his last matches of the season, claiming All-American honors.

2008–09 
During his junior year he won the Cliff Keen title (with wins over returning AA O'Connor and defending NCAA champion Jordan Leen), where he was named the Outstanding Wrestler. He also broke the school's single-season dual takedown record for the second straight year with 117 in 19 duals, only giving up one himself, to future three-time Bellator MMA World Champion Michael Chandler. Burroughs then claimed his second Big 12 title with wins over Oklahoma State's Neil Erisman and once again over Chandler. Entering as an undefeated (34–0) top-seed, he claimed his first NCAA title by beating fellow undefeated (17–0) second-seed Mike Poeta in the finals. He also defeated future UFC fighter Gregor Gillespie in the semifinals.

2009–10 
Burroughs was having a 7–0 regular season, including a single win at the Las Vegas Invitational against eventual UFC Interim Champion Justin Gaethje (he forfeited the next matches due to an injury from the match), before suffering a season-ending injury at a dual match against Central Michigan's Steve Brown, where he dropped an overtime loss due to the injury. This led to a medical redshirt for the remainder of the year.

2010–11 
Burroughs started his comeback senior season strong with a Harold Nichols Classic and Midlands Championships with a win over returning NCAA champion Andrew Howe in the finals, receiving the Dan Gable Most Outstanding Wrestler award due to his performance in the tournament. This capped a perfect 29–0 to finish the regular season. At the Big 12 championships, he defeated second-ranked in the country Tyler Caldwell 2–1 to claim the championship. At the NCAA tournament, he again defeated Caldwell in the finals to become a two-time national champion. He was awarded the Dan Hodge Trophy as the best collegiate wrestler in the country after an undefeated season. He graduated with 128 wins and 20 losses overall, 13 of those coming in his first year.

Freestyle career

2007 
Burroughs made his senior-level debut at the US University Nationals on April, where he placed second to Teyon Ware.

2011 
Just three weeks after graduating from college, Burroughs made an immediate jump into the freestyle scene, competing at the US Open on April 7–10. He dismantled all of his four opponents (including Nick Marable and Bobby Nash) to claim the championship.

On May 5, he defeated Aniuar Geduev from Russia, at the annual Beat the Streets dual. At the US World Team Trials of June 9–11, Burroughs defeated US University National Champion Andrew Howe twice in a row to become the US World Team Member at 74 kilograms. He then won the Ukrainian Memorial International tournament on July 23–24, winning every period of his five matches and coming out with a notable victory over Musa Murtazaliev.

At the World Championships on September 18, Burroughs was able to make a 5–0 mark in the stacked weight class, defeating the likes of two-time and defending World Champion Denis Tsargush, Central American and Caribbean Games champion Ricardo Roberty, Military World medalist Ashraf Aliyev and Sadegh Goudarzi, 10' World Silver medalist and Asian Games champion. By this result, Burroughs became the third Cornhusker to win a world title for the United States of America.

To close the year, the recently crowned World Champion won his first Pan American Games title on October 24, after running through all of his three opponents.

2012 
Burroughs started off his legendary year by winning the Dave Schultz Memorial International on February 1–4, where he defeated the likes of Tyler Caldwell and Trent Paulson. He travelled to Cuba for the Cerro Pelado International on February 14–15, where he once again claimed the gold medal, now with victories over Nick Marable and Paulson. On April 21, he claimed the US Olympic spot at 74 kilograms after downing Andrew Howe once, as he was forced to forfeit the next match.

Burroughs was selected to represent the United States at the World Cup on May 12–13. He collected notable wins for his resume after beating the likes of Akhmed Gadzhimagomedov, Sosuke Takatani, Sadegh Goudarzi and Davit Khutsishvili, to claim gold. He also dominated Russia's Kamel Malikov at the annual Beat the Streets.

At the 2012 Summer Olympics of London on August 10, Burroughs opened up with a dominant 4–0, 6–0 performance over Francisco Soler from Puerto Rico and followed up with a 2–1, 1–1 score over Matt Gentry from Canada, to advance to the semifinals. In the semis, he took out two–time World Champion and three-time European champion Denis Tsargush from Russia, in a rough 3–1, 0–2, 2–1 to advance to the final, where he shut down the highly accomplished Sadegh Goudarzi from Iran, 1–0, 1–0, to claim his Olympic gold medal.

2013 
The newly crowned Olympic champion, Burroughs won his second World Cup on February 21–22, defeating Sosuke Takatani, Ezzatollah Akbari, and Ali Shabanau. On March 1–2, he also won the Alexander Medved Prizes International title.

On April 17–19, he came back to the national circuit to claim his second US Open title, defeating Penn State legend David Taylor in the process. He then defeated Saba Khubezhty in two different duals, the first one at the Rumble on the Rails and the second one at Beat the Streets, on May 15 and 19 respectively.

Burroughs made his second US World Team on June 21–23, when he defeated recent graduate and four-time NCAA champion Kyle Dake twice, remaining un-scored (7–0) in the first match and going to overtime (8–6) in the second. He then warmed up with a Stepan Sargsyan International title on August 3–4, compiling four more victories to his streak.

Four weeks prior to the World Championships, Burroughs broke his ankle, however, he was once again victorious at the tournament, now in even more dominant fashion. He outscored his opposition 34–3, and recorded technical falls in three of his five matches (including Narsingh Yadav and Jabrayil Hasanov), the two remaining being a disqualification win against Ali Shabanau and a 4–0 match in the finale against Ezzatollah Akbari, to crown himself as a two-time World Champion.

In 2014, Burroughs received the 2013 John Smith Award as USA Wrestling's Freestyle Wrestler of the Year.

2014 
Burroughs travelled to Turkey to compete at the Yasar Dogu on February 15–16, where he won over Rashid Kurbanov (6–0) and Pürevjavyn Önörbat (TF 10–0) before his legendary 70-match win streak and undefeated 70–0 record since crossing over to freestyle full-time were broken by Nick Marable, in a 4–4 loss. He went on to claim the bronze medal.

Despite his streak being snapped, Burroughs continued to dominate his opposition, next representing the United States at the World Cup on March 15–16, where he got two falls (one over Parveen Rana), two tech falls and one 7–1 decision over Ezzatollah Akbari, helping the United States reach third-place and claiming his second individual World Cup. He also claimed his third US Open title on April 15–19, after defeating two-time Dan Hodge Trophy winner David Taylor in an exciting finale. Before the US WTT, Burroughs pinned Russia's Atsamaz Sanakoev on May 7 at Beat the Streets.

At the US World Team Trials of May 31–June 1, Burroughs defeated Taylor for the third and fourth times in his senior career to secure the spot, the first a fairly dominant performance by the Olympic gold medalist (6–2) and the second as close as the US Open's match between the two (6–5). To warm up, Burroughs competed in Mexico City and claimed a Pan American title on July 15–17, while defeating the accomplished Liván López from Cuba in the finals.

At the World Championships of September 8–14, Burroughs advanced to the semifinals without much problem, beating four-time African Champion Augusto Midana (spraining his MCL throughout the match) and Rashid Kurbanov, who would go on to win the Asian Games Gold medal 20 days later. Despite initial success in the tournament, he was unable to secure his fourth consecutive World/Olympic title, as he was downed by Denis Tsargush 2–9, but captured the bronze medal by pinning Rustam Dudaiev from Ukraine. The loss to Tsargush marked the first time he had been defeated by an international wrestler in over 60 international matches.

2015 
Burroughs came back to competition on March 6–7 at the Alexander Medved Prizes International. He made his way to the gold medal in the stacked bracket, defeating Rashid Kurbanov, Ali Shabanau, and Jakob Makarashvili in the process.

Burroughs then competed on April 11–12 at the 15' World Cup. He powered through Cuba's Liván López, Russia's Iakubali Shikhdzhamalov, Mongolia's Pürevjavyn Önörbat and Iran's Morteza Rezaei Ghaleh to claim his fourth straight World Cup. He also downed Luis Quintana in his fifth-consecutive appearance at Beat the Streets, now on May 12. At the US World Team Trials of June 12–14, Burroughs defeated the challenger Kyle Dake twice, winning by decision in the first match (6–3) and dismantling the later 15' US National champion with a technical fall (14–4). To warm up, Burroughs won his second Pan American Games title on July 18, defeating Liván López (for the third time in his career), Jevon Balfour and Yoan Blanco.

At the World Championships of September 12, Burroughs had a tough six-match run, being dominant on his way to the semifinals (scores of 5–2, TF 10–0, TF 11–0, 5–0) before bumping into European Games champion Aniuar Geduev, whom he was able to defeat in a close 4–3 match. At the finals, Burroughs outclassed his opponent Pürevjavyn Önörbat with a technical fall to help the United States place second at the tournament.

2016 
To start off the Olympic year, Burroughs won his second Yasar Dogu gold medal February 4–6, racking up notable wins over Soner Demirtaş and Zelimkhan Khadjiev. He also won his second Pan American title on February 26–28, with dominant performances at the tournament. At the 2016 US Olympic Team Trials of April 10, Burroughs dismantled 12' opponent Andrew Howe with a 9–3 in the first match and a technical fall in the second to make his second Olympic Team. He also competed at Beat the Streets for the sixth time, now on May 19 against 15' Asian Champion Peyman Yarahmadi, whom he almost tech'd with an 11–2 score.

Burroughs was then expected to compete at the World Cup on June 11–12, however, he chose to withdraw from the tournament as the birth of his second child was coming up. Burroughs won his last tournament before the Summer Olympics at the Germany Grand Prix, on July 2, soundly defeating Bekzod Abdurakhmonov and Martin Obst.

On August 19, Burroughs competed at the 2016 Summer Olympics, entering the tournament as a heavy-favorite to win his second gold medal. After an 8–3 win in the Round of 16 against eight-time African Championships medalist Augusto Midana, he wrestled Aniuar Geduev (whom he was 2–0 against) in the quarterfinals. After a match full of emotions, Burroughs was violently upset with a close 2–3 loss, which stunned the United States and sent him to the consolation bracket. At the consolation semifinals, Burroughs was defeated in an impressive fashion, as Bekzod Abdurakhmonov (whom he had comfortably beaten a month prior) was able to pick up the win by technical fall over the American. After being sent home, an emotional Burroughs with tears on his eyes, stated:

2017 
After a long lay-off, Burroughs came back to the scene at the World Cup on February 16–17, where he was able to put his name back on notice once with four victories over foreigner opponents. He then went back to the National scene, as he competed at the US Open on April 26–29. At the tournament, he outscored his opponents 32 points to 2 up until the finals, where he was able to edge long-time rival Kyle Dake with a 2–2 criteria win to claim his fourth US Open title. On May 17, he defeated Sosuke Takatani at Beat the Streets.

Burroughs then faced his US Open opponent Kyle Dake at the US World Team Trials on June 9–10. He lost the first match of the best-of-three via criteria, 6–6, but was able to conquer the spot in the two following bouts with convincing decisions, 8–4 and 6–2. He travelled to Madrid to compete at the Spain Grand Prix on July 15–16, where he picked up four victories and notable ones over Taimuraz Friev and Jevon Balfour, winning all of his matches with the same score, 10–0.

At the World Championships of August 26, Burroughs had a tough challenge in the first round, despite defeating the two-time World Championship bronze medalist Ali Shabanau with a close score of 7–5. He then advanced to the second round and quarterfinals, where he tech'd his opposition, downing his BTS opponent Sosuke Takatani with a score of 12–2 and Zelimkhan Khadjiev with a score of 13–2, respectively. He then proclaimed redemption at Bekzod Abdurakhmonov, whom he was tech'd by at the Olympics, with a score of 6–5 to pass on to the finale. At the finals, he faced Russian National Champion Khetag Tsabolov and was able to beat him 9–6 to reclaim his throne at 74 kilograms .

After his World Championship run, Burroughs was named a Comeback Wrestler of the Year by United World Wrestling on December 27.

2018 
Burroughs started off the year strong by winning his sixth World Cup on April 7–8 at Iowa City, Iowa, bumping up his record at such tournament to 27–0 and clinching the team title for Team USA. He then faced Frank Chamizo for the first time, going to a close and exciting come-from-behind 6–5 decision win, giving birth to one of the best rivalries in recent wrestling history.

He then made his eight World or Olympic team on June 8–9, at the '18 Final X: Lincoln, where he was the crowd-favorite as Lincoln, Nebraska is the city where he attended college. He did so by defeating US Open champion and NCAA legend Isaiah Martinez, with a 4–1 score in the first match and a case-closing 11–1 technical fall in the second. Burroughs took a trip to Istanbul, Turkey to compete at the Yasar Dogu tournament on July 27–29, where he made the finale comfortably, to face Frank Chamizo. In a high-scoring match packed with action, Burroughs found himself defeated by the Italian via criteria, 10–10 to make the series a tie and claim his first silver medal in his entire freestyle career since crossing over.

At the World Championships of October 20–21, he defeated Mostafa Hosseinkhani from Iran in the opening round, 4–3, but suffered an upset in the quarterfinals to two-time and reigning Russian National champion and eventual winner of the championship Zaurbek Sidakov in a close 5–6 loss. However, he came back in the consolation semis, where he defeated Miroslav Kirov from Belarus by a 9–0 decision. At the bronze medal match, he faced Frank Chamizo and was able to break the tie with a 4–4 criteria win to claim the third-place, therefore his sixth medal from Worlds.

2019 
Burroughs started off his athletic year in Bulgaria, at the Dan Kolov – Nikola Petrov Memorial of February 28 to March 3. In this tournament, he beat Frank Chamizo once again with a convincing 9–2 win and also got a notable victory over Bekzod Abdurakhmonov to claim the championship. On April 19–21 Burroughs competed at his first Pan American Championships since 2016, and was able to claim his third title with notable victories over Franklin Gómez and Jevon Balfour.

On May 6, Burroughs competed at Beat the Streets against UFC undefeated star and former Dan Hodge Trophy winner Ben Askren. He was able to outclass the long-time retired wrestler via 11–0 technical fall. On June 14–15, Burroughs made his seventh US World Team by claiming the spot at 19' Final X: Lincoln. Just like last year, he faced Isaiah Martinez, World Cup champion and two-time US Open champion, who pushed Burroughs to a closer series to last year's. In the first match, Burroughs won a close 5–4 decision, but was defeated via criteria in the second match (5–5) and was forced to come back with a dominant 7–1 to claim the series.

On July 11–14, Burroughs claimed his second Yasar Dogu title, beating 18' U23 World champion Tajmuraz Salkazanov and Yakup Gör in the process. In the finals, he was scheduled to face Frank Chamizo, however, Chamizo pulled out of the bout and Burroughs claimed gold. On August 10, Burroughs took home his third Pan American games title with notable wins over Geandry Garzón and Franklin Gómez, helping to clinch the team title for the United States.

At the World Championships of September 20–21, Burroughs started off with two close victories, coming from behind in both of them and winning 11–10 and 6–4 respectively. He then picked up a solid win to make his way into the semifinals, where he was once again stopped by Zaurbek Sidakov by one point scored in the last second in a 3–4 match, forcing him to compete for the bronze medal. In the third-place match, he was able to defeat Mao Okui with a dominant 10–0 technical fall.

2020 
On March 6–9, Burroughs claimed his fourth Pan American Championship with dominant scores of 10–0, 3–0 and 8–1 over Jorge Llano, Geandry Garzón and Franklin Gómez.

Burroughs was scheduled to compete at the '20 US Olympic Team Trials on April 4 at State College, Pennsylvania. However, the event was postponed for 2021 along with the Summer Olympics due to the COVID-19 pandemic, leaving all the qualifiers unable to compete.

After months of not being able to compete due to the COVID-19 pandemic, Burroughs wrestled two-time NCAA champion and '19 US National Champion at 86 kilos Zahid Valencia, at a catchweight of 185 pounds in the headline of FloWrestling: Burroughs vs. Valencia, on November 14. At the weigh-ins, Burroughs weighed 178.2 pounds, while Valencia marked 184.1 pounds on the scale. After being topped 0–4 in the first period, Burroughs overcame Valencia and took the lead, outscoring him 8–1 in the second period to mark the final score 8-5 and claim the dual.

2021 
After downing the number two-ranked 86 kilogram'er in the country, Burroughs had been booked to wrestle former rival and '18 World Champion David Taylor at 86 kilos, while headlining FloWrestling: Burroughs vs. Taylor, which would take place on January 9. However, it was announced on January 8 that Taylor was unable to travel to Austin, Texas due to COVID-19 restrictions and the bout was subsequently postponed for four days later and changed its location for Lincoln, Nebraska, thus moving to a different card also named FloWrestling: Burroughs vs. Taylor. After a 0-4 period, Burroughs rallied late to score four points of his own, but was unable to secure the victory as Taylor had criteria, defeating Burroughs for the first time in five matches.

After a full year without competing at 74 kilograms, Burroughs competed at the prestigious Matteo Pellicone Ranking Series. To make the finals, Burroughs shut down '20 Asian Continental Champion Daniyar Kaisanov and the accomplished Narsingh Yadav. In the finale, he faced two-time World Champion Frank Chamizo for the fifth time, and was edged in a close match by a point, marking the second time Burroughs had ever been defeated in a final (first loss was also handed by Chamizo) and claiming the silver medal.

In April 3, Burroughs competed at the rescheduled US Olympic Team Trials in an attempt to make his tenth straight US World/Olympic Team. Able to sit out as a 2019 World Championship medalist, Burroughs faced reigning and two–time World Champion at 79kg and former rival Kyle Dake in a best–of–three final. Both matches were similar and had the same result, with Dake coming out on top after seemingly shutting down the Olympic champion with the scores of 2–3 and 0–3. This marked the first time Burroughs was unable to make the US Olympic or World Team, ending a dominant nine–year long reign.

Burroughs had been set to wrestle former rival Isaiah Martinez on June 18 at Who's Number One, but on June 14, Martinez announced he would not be able to make the weight of 79 kilograms and the bout was cancelled.

After initial manifestation of moving up to 79 kilograms in April, Burroughs registered to bulk up and compete at the 2021 US World Team Trials on September 11–12 as the top-seed, intending to represent the country at the World Championships for the eight time. Burroughs showed immense longevity in his career while displaying his signature double leg throughout the tournament, dropping All-Americans Hayden Hidlay and Chance Marsteller as well as three-time NCAA champion Jason Nolf, advancing to the finals. In a best-of-three series, Burroughs downed another three-time NCAA champion in Alex Dieringer twice in a row in frenetic bouts, getting back on the top of the podium for the first time since March 2020. During his second match with Dieringer, Burroughs suffered a torn calf muscle, and he was told by the doctors that he would need eight weeks to recover, but still represented the United States at the 2021 World Championships from October 3 to 4 in Oslo, Norway, less than a month later.

To make his first World Championship final since 2017, Burroughs won four matches during the first date, including a close bout with two-time U23 European champion Radik Valiev. He topped Mohammad Nokhodi from Iran in the finals in order to capture the gold at the new weight class and become a five-time World Champion, cementing his legacy as one of the most accomplished American wrestlers of all time.

2022 
After defeating Nestor Taffur at Bout at the Ballpark in February 12, Burroughs competed at the prestigious Yasar Dogu International on February 27, claiming the gold medal. On May 8, he swept the competition at the 2022 Pan American  Championships to add a fifth title to his name.

On September 16, at the World Championships in Belgrade, Burroughs won his second straight world championship at 79 kg, and sixth overall.

Personal life
Burroughs is a Christian. He has spoken about his faith saying, "A gold medal is always going to leave you empty. ... There's no other thing in life that's more fulfilling than a relationship with Jesus Christ. Contentment is one of the biggest things I've learned, knowing that regardless of where you are in life, it's all about being content with God's provision." Jordan is married to Lauren Burroughs (née Mariacher) and has four children, Beacon, Ora, Rise, and Banner. Burroughs is a football fan and supports the Buffalo Bills.

Burroughs has cross-trained with several high-profile figures from the MMA community over the years and has often been linked with making a move to the sport, but publicly explained on an episode of the Joe Rogan Experience that he had decided against doing so on account of his wife, Lauren, and a general concern for maintaining his health.

Freestyle record

! colspan="7"| Freestyle matches
|-
!  Res.
!  Record
!  Opponent
!  Score
!  Date
!  Event
!  Location
|-
! style=background:white colspan=7 |
|-
|Win
|223–15
|align=left| Mohammad Nokhodi
|style="font-size:88%"|4–2
|style="font-size:88%" rowspan=5|September 15–16, 2022
|style="font-size:88%" rowspan=5|2022 World Championships
|style="text-align:left;font-size:88%;" rowspan=5| Belgrade, Serbia
|-
|Win
|222–15
|align=left| Ali Umarpashaev
|style="font-size:88%"|9–2
|-
|Win
|221–15
|align=left| Arsalan Budazhapov
|style="font-size:88%"|TF 10–0
|-
|Win
|220–15
|align=left| Dejan Mitrov
|style="font-size:88%"|TF 12–1
|-
|Win
|219–15
|align=left| Sahergeldi Saparmyradov
|style="font-size:88%"|TF 12–1
|-
! style=background:white colspan=7 |
|-
|Win
|218–15
|align=left| Chance Marsteller
|style="font-size:88%"|5–0
|style="font-size:88%" rowspan=3|June 8, 2022
|style="font-size:88%" rowspan=3|2022 Final X NYC
|style="text-align:left;font-size:88%;" rowspan=3| New York City, New York
|-
|Loss
|217–15
|align=left| Chance Marsteller
|style="font-size:88%"|2–2
|-
|Win
|217–14
|align=left| Chance Marsteller
|style="font-size:88%"|4–0
|-
! style=background:white colspan=7 |
|-
|Win
|216–14
|align=left| Miguel Ordenas
|style="font-size:88%"|TF 10–0
|style="font-size:88%" rowspan=4|May 8, 2022
|style="font-size:88%" rowspan=4|2022 Pan American Continental Championships
|style="text-align:left;font-size:88%;" rowspan=4| Acapulco, Mexico
|-
|Win
|215–14
|align=left| Juan Rivera
|style="font-size:88%"|TF 10–0
|-
|Win
|214–14
|align=left| Victor Santos
|style="font-size:88%"|Fall
|-
|Win
|213–14
|align=left| Samuel Barmish
|style="font-size:88%"|TF 12–1
|-
! style=background:white colspan=7 |
|-
|Win
|212–14
|align=left| Chance Marsteller
|style="font-size:88%"|8–0
|style="font-size:88%" rowspan=5|February 27, 2022
|style="font-size:88%" rowspan=5|2022 Yasar Dogu International
|style="text-align:left;font-size:88%;" rowspan=5|
 Istanbul, Turkey
|-
|Win
|211–14
|align=left| Ali Bakhtiar Savadkouhi
|style="font-size:88%"|2–1
|-
|Win
|210–14
|align=left| Gadzhimurad Alikhmaev
|style="font-size:88%"|4–1
|-
|Win
|209–14
|align=left| Zhiger Zakirov
|style="font-size:88%"|TF 10–0
|-
|Win
|208–14
|align=left| Meiir Koshkinbayev
|style="font-size:88%"|TF 14–0
|-
|Win
|207–14
|align=left| Nestor Taffur
|style="font-size:88%"|TF 11–0
|style="font-size:88%"|February 13, 2022
|style="font-size:88%"|2022 Bout at the Ballpark
|style="text-align:left;font-size:88%;"|
 Arlington, Texas
|-
! style=background:white colspan=7 |
|-
|Win
|206–14
|align=left| Mohammad Nokhodi
|style="font-size:88%"|5–1
|style="font-size:88%"|October 4, 2021
|style="font-size:88%" rowspan=5|2021 World Championships
|style="text-align:left;font-size:88%;" rowspan=5| Oslo, Norway
|-
|Win
|205–14
|align=left| Ryuki Yoshida
|style="font-size:88%"|10–1
|style="font-size:88%" rowspan=4|October 3, 2021
|-
|Win
|204–14
|align=left| Radik Valiev
|style="font-size:88%"|9–4
|-
|
|
|align=left| Bolat Sakayev
|style="font-size:88%"|FF
|-
|Win
|203–14
|align=left| Sam Barmish
|style="font-size:88%"|TF 10–0
|-
! style=background:white colspan=7 |
|-
|Win 
|202–14
|align=left| Alex Dieringer
|style="font-size:88%"|4–3
|style="font-size:88%" rowspan=2|September 12, 2021
|style="font-size:88%" rowspan=5|2021 US World Team Trials
|style="text-align:left;font-size:88%;" rowspan=5| Lincoln, Nebraska
|-
|Win 
|201–14
|align=left| Alex Dieringer
|style="font-size:88%"|10–5
|-
|Win 
|200–14
|align=left| Jason Nolf
|style="font-size:88%"|5–3
|style="font-size:88%" rowspan=3|September 11, 2021
|-
|Win 
|199–14
|align=left| Chance Marsteller
|style="font-size:88%"|4–1
|-
|Win 
|198–14
|align=left| Hayden Hidlay
|style="font-size:88%"|7–3
|-
! style=background:white colspan=7 |
|-
|Loss 
|197–14
|align=left| Kyle Dake
|style="font-size:88%"|2–3
|style="font-size:88%" rowspan=2|April 3, 2021
|style="font-size:88%" rowspan=2|2020 US Olympic Team Trials
|style="text-align:left;font-size:88%;" rowspan=2| Fort Worth, Texas
|-
|Loss 
|197–13
|align=left| Kyle Dake
|style="font-size:88%"|0–3
|-
! style=background:white colspan=7 | 
|-
|Loss 
|197–12
|align=left| Frank Chamizo
|style="font-size:88%"|2–3
|style="font-size:88%" rowspan=3|March 7, 2021
|style="font-size:88%" rowspan=3|Matteo Pellicone Ranking Series 2021
|style="text-align:left;font-size:88%;" rowspan=3|
 Rome, Italy
|-
|Win 
|197–11
|align=left| Narsingh Yadav
|style="font-size:88%"|4–1
|-
|Win 
|196–11
|align=left| Daniyar Kaisanov
|style="font-size:88%"|5–0
|-
|Loss
|195–11
|align=left| David Taylor
|style="font-size:88%"|4–4
|style="font-size:88%"|January 13, 2021
|style="font-size:88%"|FloWrestling: Burroughs vs. Taylor
|style="text-align:left;font-size:88%;" |
 Lincoln, Nebraska
|-
|Win
|195–10
|align=left| Zahid Valencia
|style="font-size:88%"|8–5
|style="font-size:88%"|November 14, 2020
|style="font-size:88%"|FloWrestling: Burroughs vs. Valencia
|style="text-align:left;font-size:88%;" |
 Austin, Texas

|-
! style=background:white colspan=7 |
|-
|Win
|194–10
|align=left| Franklin Gómez
|style="font-size:88%"|8–1
|style="font-size:88%" rowspan=3|March 6–9, 2020
|style="font-size:88%" rowspan=3|2020 Pan American Wrestling Championships
|style="text-align:left;font-size:88%;" rowspan=3| Ottawa, Canada
|-
|Win
|193–10
|align=left| Geandry Garzón
|style="font-size:88%"|3–0
|-
|Win
|192–10
|align=left| Jorge Llano
|style="font-size:88%"|TF 10–0
|-
! style=background:white colspan=7 |
|-
|Win
|191–10
|align=left| Mao Okui
|style="font-size:88%"|TF 10–0
|style="font-size:88%" rowspan=5|September 20–21, 2019
|style="font-size:88%" rowspan=5|2019 World Wrestling Championships
|style="text-align:left;font-size:88%;" rowspan=5| Nur-Sultan, Kazakhstan
|-
|Loss
|190–10
|align=left| Zaurbek Sidakov
|style="font-size:88%"|3–4
|-
|Win
|190–9
|align=left| Khadzhimurad Gadzhiyev
|style="font-size:88%"|8–1
|-
|Win
|189–9
|align=left| Murad Kuramagomedov
|style="font-size:88%"|6–4
|-
|Win
|188–9
|align=left| Azamat Nurykau
|style="font-size:88%"|11–10
|-
! style=background:white colspan=7 |
|-
|Win
|187–9
|align=left| Franklin Gómez
|style="font-size:88%"|4–1
|style="font-size:88%" rowspan=3|August 10, 2019
|style="font-size:88%" rowspan=3|2019 Pan American Games
|style="text-align:left;font-size:88%;" rowspan=3| Lima, Perú
|-
|Win
|186–9
|align=left| Geandry Garzón
|style="font-size:88%"|TF 15–4
|-
|Win
|185–9
|align=left| Abel Herrera
|style="font-size:88%"|TF 10–0
|-
! style=background:white colspan=7 |
|-
|Win
|184–9
|align=left| Yakup Gör
|style="font-size:88%"|TF 12–2
|style="font-size:88%" rowspan=3|July 11–14, 2019
|style="font-size:88%" rowspan=3|2019 Yaşar Doğu International
|style="text-align:left;font-size:88%;" rowspan=3| Istanbul, Turkey
|-
|Win
|183–9
|align=left| Tajmuraz Salkazanov
|style="font-size:88%"|6–4
|-
|Win
|182–9
|align=left| Csaba Vida
|style="font-size:88%"|TF 10–0
|-
! style=background:white colspan=7 |
|-
|Win
|181–9
|align=left| Isaiah Martinez
|style="font-size:88%"|7–1
|style="font-size:88%" rowspan=3|June 14–15, 2019
|style="font-size:88%" rowspan=3|2019 US World Team Trials
|style="text-align:left;font-size:88%;" rowspan=3| Lincoln, Nebraska
|-
|Loss
|180–9
|align=left| Isaiah Martinez
|style="font-size:88%"|5–5
|-
|Win
|180–8
|align=left| Isaiah Martinez
|style="font-size:88%"|5–4
|-
|Win
|179–8
|align=left| Ben Askren
|style="font-size:88%"|TF 11–0
|style="font-size:88%"|May 6, 2019
|style="font-size:88%"|2019 Beat The Streets: Grapple at the Garden
|style="text-align:left;font-size:88%;" |
 New York City, New York
|-
! style=background:white colspan=7 |
|-
|Win
|178–8
|align=left| Jevon Balfour
|style="font-size:88%"|7–0
|style="font-size:88%" rowspan=4|April 19–21, 2019
|style="font-size:88%" rowspan=4|2019 Pan American Wrestling Championships
|style="text-align:left;font-size:88%;" rowspan=4| Buenos Aires, Argentina
|-
|Win
|177–8
|align=left| Adonis Arroyo
|style="font-size:88%"|TF 10–0
|-
|Win
|176–8
|align=left| Franklin Gómez
|style="font-size:88%"|5–2
|-
|Win
|175–8
|align=left| Freddy Vera
|style="font-size:88%"|9–0
|-
! style=background:white colspan=7 |
|-
|Win
|174–8
|align=left| Bekzod Abdurakhmonov
|style="font-size:88%"|4–3
|style="font-size:88%" rowspan=4|February 28 – March 3, 2019
|style="font-size:88%" rowspan=4|2019 Dan Kolov – Nikola Petrov Memorial
|style="text-align:left;font-size:88%;" rowspan=4| Ruse, Bulgaria
|-
|Win
|173–8
|align=left| Ali Umarpashaev
|style="font-size:88%"|7–2
|-
|Win
|172–8
|align=left| Frank Chamizo
|style="font-size:88%"|9–2
|-
|Win
|171–8
|align=left| Jitender
|style="font-size:88%"|9–0
|-
! style=background:white colspan=7 |
|-
|Win
|170–8
|align=left| Frank Chamizo
|style="font-size:88%"|4–4
|style="font-size:88%" rowspan=4|October 20–21, 2018
|style="font-size:88%" rowspan=4|2018 World Wrestling Championships
|style="text-align:left;font-size:88%;" rowspan=4| Budapest, Hungary
|-
|Win
|169–8
|align=left| Miroslav Kirov
|style="font-size:88%"|9–0
|-
|Loss
|168–8
|align=left| Zaurbek Sidakov
|style="font-size:88%"|5–6
|-
|Win
|167–7
|align=left| Mostafa Hosseinkhani
|style="font-size:88%"|4–3
|-
! style=background:white colspan=7 |
|-
|Loss
|166–7
|align=left| Frank Chamizo
|style="font-size:88%"|10–10
|style="font-size:88%" rowspan=4|July 27–29, 2018
|style="font-size:88%" rowspan=4|2018 Yaşar Doğu International
|style="text-align:left;font-size:88%;" rowspan=4| Istanbul, Turkey
|-
|Win
|166–6
|align=left| Bolat Sakayev
|style="font-size:88%"|9–4
|-
|Win
|165–6
|align=left| Nurykan Azamat
|style="font-size:88%"|TF 10–0
|-
|Win
|164–6
|align=left| Saeed Zervanatareq
|style="font-size:88%"|TF 10–0
|-
! style=background:white colspan=7 |
|-
|Win
|163–6
|align=left| Isaiah Martinez
|style="font-size:88%"|TF 11–1
|style="font-size:88%" rowspan=2|June 8–9, 2018
|style="font-size:88%" rowspan=2|2018 US World Team Trials
|style="text-align:left;font-size:88%;" rowspan=2| Lincoln, Nebraska
|-
|Win
|162–6
|align=left| Isaiah Martinez
|style="font-size:88%"|4–1
|-
|Win
|161–6
|align=left| Frank Chamizo
|style="font-size:88%"|6–5
|style="font-size:88%"|May 17, 2018
|style="font-size:88%"|2018 Beat The Streets: Team USA vs. The World All-Stars
|style="text-align:left;font-size:88%;" |
 New York City, New York
|-
! style=background:white colspan=7 |
|-
|Win
|160–6
|align=left| Gasjimurad Omarov
|style="font-size:88%"|Fall
|style="font-size:88%" rowspan=3|April 7–8, 2018
|style="font-size:88%" rowspan=3|2018 World Cup
|style="text-align:left;font-size:88%;" rowspan=3| Iowa City, Iowa
|-
|Win
|159–6
|align=left| Tarzan Maisuradze
|style="font-size:88%"|TF 10–0
|-
|Win
|158–6
|align=left| Yuhi Fujinami
|style="font-size:88%"|7–1
|-
! style=background:white colspan=7 |
|-
|Win
|157–6
|align=left| Khetag Tsabolov
|style="font-size:88%"|9–6
|style="font-size:88%" rowspan=5|August 21–27, 2017
|style="font-size:88%" rowspan=5|2017 World Wrestling Championships
|style="text-align:left;font-size:88%;" rowspan=5| Paris, France
|-
|Win
|156–6
|align=left| Bekzod Abdurakhmonov
|style="font-size:88%"|6–5
|-
|Win
|155–6
|align=left| Zelimkhan Khadjiev
|style="font-size:88%"|TF 13–2
|-
|Win
|154–6
|align=left| Sosuke Takatani
|style="font-size:88%"|TF 12–2
|-
|Win
|153–6
|align=left| Ali Shabanau
|style="font-size:88%"|7–5
|-
! style=background:white colspan=7 |
|-
|Win
|152–6
|align=left| Jevon Balfour
|style="font-size:88%"|TF 10–0
|style="font-size:88%" rowspan=4|July 15–16, 2017
|style="font-size:88%" rowspan=4|2017 Grand Prix of Spain
|style="text-align:left;font-size:88%;" rowspan=4| Madrid, Spain
|-
|Win
|151–6
|align=left| Seyedali Mousavi
|style="font-size:88%"|TF 10–0
|-
|Win
|150–6
|align=left| Nurgaliy Zholayev
|style="font-size:88%"|TF 10–0
|-
|Win
|149–6
|align=left| Taimuraz Friev
|style="font-size:88%"|TF 10–0
|-
! style=background:white colspan=7 |
|-
|Win
|148–6
|align=left| Kyle Dake
|style="font-size:88%"|6–2
|style="font-size:88%" rowspan=3|June 9–10, 2017
|style="font-size:88%" rowspan=3|2017 US World Team Trials
|style="text-align:left;font-size:88%;" rowspan=3| Lincoln, Nebraska
|-
|Win
|147–6
|align=left| Kyle Dake
|style="font-size:88%"|8–4
|-
|Loss
|146–6
|align=left| Kyle Dake
|style="font-size:88%"|6–6
|-
|Win
|146–5
|align=left| Sosuke Takatani
|style="font-size:88%"|9–2
|style="font-size:88%"|May 17, 2017
|style="font-size:88%"|2017 Beat The Streets: Times Square
|style="text-align:left;font-size:88%;" |
 New York City, New York
|-
! style=background:white colspan=7 |
|-
|Win
|145–5
|align=left| Kyle Dake
|style="font-size:88%"|2–2
|style="font-size:88%" rowspan=5|April 26–29, 2017
|style="font-size:88%" rowspan=5|2017 US Open Championships
|style="text-align:left;font-size:88%;" rowspan=5| Las Vegas, Nevada
|-
|Win
|144–5
|align=left| Kevin Levalley
|style="font-size:88%"|TF 12–2
|-
|Win
|143–5
|align=left| Dan Vallimont
|style="font-size:88%"|6–0
|-
|Win
|142–5
|align=left| Michael Moreno
|style="font-size:88%"|4–0
|-
|Win
|141–5
|align=left| Jeremy Anderson
|style="font-size:88%"|TF 10–0
|-
! style=background:white colspan=7 |
|-
|Win
|140–5
|align=left| Peyman Yarahmadi
|style="font-size:88%"|3–2
|style="font-size:88%" rowspan=4|February 16–17, 2017
|style="font-size:88%" rowspan=4|2017 World Cup
|style="text-align:left;font-size:88%;" rowspan=4| Kermanshah, Iran
|-
|Win
|139–5
|align=left| Murad Suleymanov
|style="font-size:88%"|DQ
|-
|Win
|138–5
|align=left| Atsamaz Sanakoev
|style="font-size:88%"|10–1
|-
|Win
|137–5
|align=left| Jumber Kvelashvili
|style="font-size:88%"|2–2
|-
! style=background:white colspan=7 |
|-
|Loss
|136–5
|align=left| Bekzod Abdurakhmonov
|style="font-size:88%"|TF 1–11
|style="font-size:88%" rowspan=3|August 19, 2016
|style="font-size:88%" rowspan=3|2016 Summer Olympics
|style="text-align:left;font-size:88%;" rowspan=3| Rio de Janeiro, Brazil
|-
|Loss
|136–4
|align=left| Aniuar Geduev
|style="font-size:88%"|2–3
|-
|Win
|136–3
|align=left| Augusto Midana
|style="font-size:88%"|8–3
|-
! style=background:white colspan=7 |
|-
|Win
|135–3
|align=left| Martin Obst
|style="font-size:88%"|3–1
|style="font-size:88%" rowspan=4|July 2, 2016
|style="font-size:88%" rowspan=4|2016 Grand Prix of Germany
|style="text-align:left;font-size:88%;" rowspan=4| Dortmund, Germany
|-
|Win
|134–3
|align=left| Bekzod Abdurakhmonov
|style="font-size:88%"|9–3
|-
|Win
|133–3
|align=left| Andrzej Sokalski
|style="font-size:88%"|TF 10–0
|-
|Win
|132–3
|align=left| Markus Knobel
|style="font-size:88%"|TF 10–0
|-
|Win
|131–3
|align=left| Peyman Yarahmadi
|style="font-size:88%"|11–2
|style="font-size:88%"|May 19, 2016
|style="font-size:88%"|2016 Beat The Streets: United In The Square
|style="text-align:left;font-size:88%;" |
 New York City, New York
|-
! style=background:white colspan=7 |
|-
|Win
|130–3
|align=left| Andrew Howe
|style="font-size:88%"|TF 10–0
|style="font-size:88%" rowspan=2|April 9–10, 2016
|style="font-size:88%" rowspan=2|2016 US Olympic Team Trials
|style="text-align:left;font-size:88%;" rowspan=2| Iowa City, Iowa
|-
|Win
|129–3
|align=left| Andrew Howe
|style="font-size:88%"|9–3
|-
! style=background:white colspan=7 |
|-
|Win
|128–3
|align=left| Carlos Izquierdo
|style="font-size:88%"|TF 12–2
|style="font-size:88%" rowspan=4|February 26–28, 2016
|style="font-size:88%" rowspan=4|2016 Pan American Championships
|style="text-align:left;font-size:88%;" rowspan=4| Frisco, Texas
|-
|Win
|127–3
|align=left| Ilya Abelev
|style="font-size:88%"|TF 13–0
|-
|Win
|126–3
|align=left| Francisco Soler
|style="font-size:88%"|Fall
|-
|Win
|125–3
|align=left| Pedro Martinez
|style="font-size:88%"|11–5
|-
! style=background:white colspan=7 |
|-
|Win
|124–3
|align=left| Zelimkhan Khadjiev
|style="font-size:88%"|TF 14–3
|style="font-size:88%" rowspan=4|February 4–6, 2016
|style="font-size:88%" rowspan=4|2016 Yaşar Doğu International
|style="text-align:left;font-size:88%;" rowspan=4| Istanbul, Turkey
|-
|Win
|123–3
|align=left| Soner Demirtaş
|style="font-size:88%"|5–0
|-
|Win
|122–3
|align=left| Abdullah Arslan
|style="font-size:88%"|TF 10–0
|-
|Win
|121–3
|align=left| Pedro Soto
|style="font-size:88%"|TF 10–0
|-
! style=background:white colspan=7 |
|-
|Win
|120–3
|align=left| Pürevjavyn Önörbat
|style="font-size:88%"|TF 10–0
|style="font-size:88%" rowspan=6|September 12, 2015
|style="font-size:88%" rowspan=6|2015 World Wrestling Championships
|style="text-align:left;font-size:88%;" rowspan=6| Las Vegas, Nevada
|-
|Win
|119–3
|align=left| Aniuar Geduev
|style="font-size:88%"|4–3
|-
|Win
|118–3
|align=left| Alireza Ghasemi
|style="font-size:88%"|5–0
|-
|Win
|117–3
|align=left| Mihály Nagy
|style="font-size:88%"|TF 11–0
|-
|Win
|116–3
|align=left| Oleg Zakharevych
|style="font-size:88%"|TF 10–0
|-
|Win
|115–3
|align=left| Krystian Brzozowski
|style="font-size:88%"|5–2
|-
! style=background:white colspan=7 |
|-
|Win
|114–3
|align=left| Yoan Blanco
|style="font-size:88%"|TF 11–0
|style="font-size:88%" rowspan=3|July 18, 2015
|style="font-size:88%" rowspan=3|2015 Pan American Games
|style="text-align:left;font-size:88%;" rowspan=3| Toronto, Ontario
|-
|Win
|113–3
|align=left| Jevon Balfour
|style="font-size:88%"|TF 11–0
|-
|Win
|112–3
|align=left| Livan Lopez
|style="font-size:88%"|TF 13–3
|-
! style=background:white colspan=7 |
|-
|Win
|111–3
|align=left| Kyle Dake
|style="font-size:88%"|TF 14–4
|style="font-size:88%" rowspan=2|June 12–14, 2015
|style="font-size:88%" rowspan=2|2015 US World Team Trials
|style="text-align:left;font-size:88%;" rowspan=2| Madison, Wisconsin
|-
|Win
|110–3
|align=left| Kyle Dake
|style="font-size:88%"|6–3
|-
|Win
|109–3
|align=left| Luis Quintana
|style="font-size:88%"|Fall
|style="font-size:88%"|May 12, 2015
|style="font-size:88%"|2015 Beat The Streets: Salsa in the Square
|style="text-align:left;font-size:88%;" |
 New York City, New York
|-
! style=background:white colspan=7 |
|-
|Win
|108–3
|align=left| Morteza Rezaei Ghaleh
|style="font-size:88%"|TF 10–0
|style="font-size:88%" rowspan=4|April 11–12, 2015
|style="font-size:88%" rowspan=4|2015 World Cup
|style="text-align:left;font-size:88%;" rowspan=4| Los Angeles, California
|-
|Win
|107–3
|align=left| Pürevjavyn Önörbat
|style="font-size:88%"|6–0
|-
|Win
|106–3
|align=left| Iakubali Shikhdzhamalov
|style="font-size:88%"|TF 10–0
|-
|Win
|105–3
|align=left| Liván López
|style="font-size:88%"|6–2
|-
! style=background:white colspan=7 |
|-
|Win
|104–3
|align=left| Jakob Makarashvili
|style="font-size:88%"|TF 12–1
|style="font-size:88%" rowspan=6|March 6–7, 2015
|style="font-size:88%" rowspan=6|2015 Alexander Medved International
|style="text-align:left;font-size:88%;" rowspan=6| Minsk, Belarus
|-
|Win
|103–3
|align=left| Ali Shabanau
|style="font-size:88%"|10–6
|-
|Win
|102–3
|align=left| Rashid Kurbanov
|style="font-size:88%"|6–5
|-
|Win
|101–3
|align=left| Askhab Geriev
|style="font-size:88%"|TF 10–0
|-
|Win
|100–3
|align=left| Gadzhi Gadzhiev
|style="font-size:88%"|5–0
|-
|Win
|99–3
|align=left| Islomiddin Rakhimov
|style="font-size:88%"|TF 10–0
|-
! style=background:white colspan=7 |
|-
|Win
|98–3
|align=left| Rustam Dudaiev
|style="font-size:88%"|Fall
|style="font-size:88%" rowspan=5|September 8–14, 2014
|style="font-size:88%" rowspan=5|2014 World Wrestling Championships
|style="text-align:left;font-size:88%;" rowspan=5| Tashkent, Uzbekistan
|-
|Loss
|97–3
|align=left| Denis Tsargush
|style="font-size:88%"|2–9
|-
|Win
|97–2
|align=left| Rashid Kurbanov
|style="font-size:88%"|5–0
|-
|Win
|96–2
|align=left| Lee Yun-seok
|style="font-size:88%"|TF 13–2
|-
|Win
|95–2
|align=left| Augusto Midana
|style="font-size:88%"|4–3
|-
! style=background:white colspan=7 |
|-
|Win
|94–2
|align=left| Livan Lopez
|style="font-size:88%"|TF 13–2
|style="font-size:88%" rowspan=4|July 15–17, 2014
|style="font-size:88%" rowspan=4|2014 Pan American Championships
|style="text-align:left;font-size:88%;" rowspan=4| Mexico City, Mexico
|-
|Win
|93–2
|align=left| Adonis Arroyo
|style="font-size:88%"|TF 10–0
|-
|Win
|92–2
|align=left| Jose Santos Ambrocio
|style="font-size:88%"|TF 10–0
|-
|Win
|91–2
|align=left| Elio Zenteno
|style="font-size:88%"|TF 10–0
|-
! style=background:white colspan=7 |
|-
|Win
|90–2
|align=left| David Taylor
|style="font-size:88%"|6–5
|style="font-size:88%" rowspan=2|May 31 – June 1, 2014
|style="font-size:88%" rowspan=2|2014 US World Team Trials
|style="text-align:left;font-size:88%;" rowspan=2| Madison, Wisconsin
|-
|Win
|89–2
|align=left| David Taylor
|style="font-size:88%"|6–2
|-
|Win
|88–2
|align=left| Atsamaz Sanakoev
|style="font-size:88%"|Fall
|style="font-size:88%"|May 7, 2014
|style="font-size:88%"|2014 Beat The Streets: Team USA vs. The World
|style="text-align:left;font-size:88%;" |
 New York City, New York
|-
! style=background:white colspan=7 |
|-
|Win
|87–2
|align=left| David Taylor
|style="font-size:88%"|7–6
|style="font-size:88%" rowspan=5|April 15–19, 2014
|style="font-size:88%" rowspan=5|2014 US Open Championships
|style="text-align:left;font-size:88%;" rowspan=5| Las Vegas, Nevada
|-
|Win
|86–2
|align=left| Quinton Godley
|style="font-size:88%"|TF 10–0
|-
|Win
|85–2
|align=left| Taylor West
|style="font-size:88%"|TF 12–2
|-
|Win
|84–2
|align=left| Chance Goodman
|style="font-size:88%"|TF 10–0
|-
|Win
|83–2
|align=left| Matt Donohoe
|style="font-size:88%"|TF 11–0
|-
! style=background:white colspan=7 |
|-
|Win
|82–2
|align=left| Murat Erturk
|style="font-size:88%"|Fall
|style="font-size:88%" rowspan=5|March 15–16, 2014
|style="font-size:88%" rowspan=5|2014 World Cup
|style="text-align:left;font-size:88%;" rowspan=5| Los Angeles, California
|-
|Win
|81–2
|align=left| Ezzatollah Akbari
|style="font-size:88%"|7–1
|-
|Win
|80–2
|align=left| Chikhladze Giya
|style="font-size:88%"|TF 15–4
|-
|Win
|79–2
|align=left| Parveen Rana
|style="font-size:88%"|Fall
|-
|Win
|78–2
|align=left| Varuzhan Kajoyan
|style="font-size:88%"|TF 16–6
|-
! style=background:white colspan=7 |
|-
|Win
|77–2
|align=left| Batuhan Demircin
|style="font-size:88%"|10–2
|style="font-size:88%" rowspan=5|February 15–16, 2014
|style="font-size:88%" rowspan=5|2014 Yaşar Doğu International
|style="text-align:left;font-size:88%;" rowspan=5| Istanbul, Turkey
|-
|Win
|76–2
|align=left| Khabib Batyrov
|style="font-size:88%"|TF 10–0
|-
|Loss
|75–2
|align=left| Nick Marable
|style="font-size:88%"|4–4
|-
|Win
|75–1
|align=left| Pürevjavyn Önörbat
|style="font-size:88%"|TF 10–0
|-
|Win
|74–1
|align=left| Rashid Kurbanov
|style="font-size:88%"|6–0
|-
! style=background:white colspan=7 |
|-
|Win
|71–1
|align=left| Ezzatollah Akbari
|style="font-size:88%"|4–0
|style="font-size:88%" rowspan=5|September 16–22, 2013
|style="font-size:88%" rowspan=5|2013 World Wrestling Championships
|style="text-align:left;font-size:88%;" rowspan=5| Budapest, Hungary
|-
|Win
|70–1
|align=left| Ali Shabanau
|style="font-size:88%"|DQ
|-
|Win
|69–1
|align=left| Jabrayil Hasanov
|style="font-size:88%"|TF 7–0
|-
|Win
|68–1
|align=left| Narsingh Pancham Yadav
|style="font-size:88%"|TF 7–0
|-
|Win
|67–1
|align=left| Gamid Dzhalilov
|style="font-size:88%"|TF 9–2
|-
! style=background:white colspan=7 |
|-
|Win
|66–1
|align=left| Akamaz Sanakoev
|style="font-size:88%"|7–6
|style="font-size:88%" rowspan=4|August 3–4, 2013
|style="font-size:88%" rowspan=4|2013 Stepan Sargsyan International
|style="text-align:left;font-size:88%;" rowspan=4| Vanadzor, Armenia
|-
|Win
|65–1
|align=left| Stanislav Khachirov
|style="font-size:88%"|TF 9–1
|-
|Win
|64–1
|align=left| Gevorg Hambarcumyan
|style="font-size:88%"|TF 10–3
|-
|Win
|63–1
|align=left| Giorgi Sanodze
|style="font-size:88%"|TF 8–0
|-
! style=background:white colspan=7 |
|-
|Win
|62–1
|align=left| Kyle Dake
|style="font-size:88%"|OT 8–6
|style="font-size:88%" rowspan=2|June 21–23, 2013
|style="font-size:88%" rowspan=2|2013 US World Team Trials
|style="text-align:left;font-size:88%;" rowspan=2| Stillwater, Oklahoma
|-
|Win
|61–1
|align=left| Kyle Dake
|style="font-size:88%"|7–0
|-
|Win
|60–1
|align=left| Saba Khubezhty
|style="font-size:88%"|TF 14–3
|style="font-size:88%"|May 19, 2013
|style="font-size:88%"|2013 Beat The Streets: United 4 Wrestling
|style="text-align:left;font-size:88%;" |
 Los Angeles, California
|-
|Win
|59–1
|align=left| Saba Khubezhty
|style="font-size:88%"|1–1, 5–0, 7–3
|style="font-size:88%"|May 15, 2013
|style="font-size:88%"|2013 Rumble on the Rails
|style="text-align:left;font-size:88%;" |
 New York City, New York
|-
! style=background:white colspan=7 |
|-
|Win
|58–1
|align=left| David Taylor
|style="font-size:88%"|3–1, 1–0
|style="font-size:88%" rowspan=4|April 17–19, 2013
|style="font-size:88%" rowspan=4|2013 US Open Championships
|style="text-align:left;font-size:88%;" rowspan=4| Las Vegas, Nevada
|-
|Win
|57–1
|align=left| Colton Sponseller
|style="font-size:88%"|1–0, 4–0
|-
|Win
|56–1
|align=left| Nate Carr
|style="font-size:88%"|2–0, 6–0
|-
|Win
|55–1
|align=left| Joe Latham
|style="font-size:88%"|TF 6–0, 6–0
|-
! style=background:white colspan=7 |
|-
|Win
|54–1
|align=left| Dmitry Rochnyak
|style="font-size:88%"|
|style="font-size:88%" rowspan=5|March 1–2, 2013
|style="font-size:88%" rowspan=5|2013 Alexander Medved International
|style="text-align:left;font-size:88%;" rowspan=5| Minsk, Belarus
|-
|Win
|53–1
|align=left| Magomed Zubairov
|style="font-size:88%"|
|-
|Win
|52–1
|align=left| Andri Nagornyi
|style="font-size:88%"|
|-
|Win
|51–1
|align=left| Ablaikhan Mursultanov
|style="font-size:88%"|
|-
|Win
|50–1
|align=left| Colt Sponseller
|style="font-size:88%"|
|-
! style=background:white colspan=7 |
|-
|Win
|49–1
|align=left| Ali Shabanau
|style="font-size:88%"|1–1, 5–0
|style="font-size:88%" rowspan=5|February 21–22, 2013
|style="font-size:88%" rowspan=5|2013 World Cup
|style="text-align:left;font-size:88%;" rowspan=5| Tehran, Iran
|-
|Win
|48–1
|align=left| Miroslav Kirov
|style="font-size:88%"|TF 7–0, 6–0
|-
|Win
|47–1
|align=left| Ezzatollah Akbari
|style="font-size:88%"|4–0, 2–0
|-
|Win
|46–1
|align=left| Sosuke Takatani
|style="font-size:88%"|2–0, 7–1
|-
|Win
|45–1
|align=left| Jakov Makarashvili
|style="font-size:88%"|2–0, 1–0
|-
! style=background:white colspan=7 |
|-
|Win
|44–1
|align=left| Sadegh Goudarzi
|style="font-size:88%"|1–0, 1–0
|style="font-size:88%" rowspan=4|August 5–12, 2012
|style="font-size:88%" rowspan=4|2012 Summer Olympics
|style="text-align:left;font-size:88%;" rowspan=4| London, United Kingdom
|-
|Win
|43–1
|align=left| Denis Tsargush
|style="font-size:88%"|3–1, 0–2, 2–1
|-
|Win
|42–1
|align=left| Matt Gentry
|style="font-size:88%"|2–1, 1–1
|-
|Win
|41–1
|align=left| Francisco Soler
|style="font-size:88%"|4–0, 6–0
|-
|Win
|40–1
|align=left| Kamel Malikov
|style="font-size:88%"|8–0, 5–0
|style="font-size:88%"|June 7, 2012
|style="font-size:88%"|2012 Beat The Streets: Grapple in the Apple
|style="text-align:left;font-size:88%;" |
 New York City, New York
|-
! style=background:white colspan=7 |
|-
|Win
|39–1
|align=left| Davit Khutsishvili
|style="font-size:88%"|
|style="font-size:88%" rowspan=5|May 12–13, 2012
|style="font-size:88%" rowspan=5|2012 World Cup
|style="text-align:left;font-size:88%;" rowspan=5| Baku, Azerbaijan
|-
|Win
|38–1
|align=left| Sadegh Goudarzi
|style="font-size:88%"|
|-
|Win
|37–1
|align=left| Demirsin Batuhan
|style="font-size:88%"|
|-
|Win
|36–1
|align=left| Sosuke Takatani
|style="font-size:88%"|4–5, 3–1, 3–2
|-
|Win
|35–1
|align=left| Akhmed Gadzhimagomedov
|style="font-size:88%"|
|-
! style=background:white colspan=7 |
|-
|Win
|34–1
|align=left| Andrew Howe
|style="font-size:88%"|4–2, 1–2, 1–0
|style="font-size:88%" |April 21, 2012
|style="font-size:88%" |2012 US Olympic Team Trials
|style="text-align:left;font-size:88%;" | Iowa City, Iowa
|-
! style=background:white colspan=7 |
|-
|Win
|33–1
|align=left| Trent Paulson
|style="font-size:88%"|2–1, 5–1
|style="font-size:88%" rowspan=3|February 14–15, 2012
|style="font-size:88%" rowspan=3|2012 Cerro Pelado International
|style="text-align:left;font-size:88%;" rowspan=3| Habana, Cuba
|-
|Win
|32–1
|align=left| Nick Marable
|style="font-size:88%"|1–0, 1–1
|-
|Win
|31–1
|align=left| Ivan Llano
|style="font-size:88%"|7–0, 6–0
|-
! style=background:white colspan=7 |
|-
|Win
|30–1
|align=left| Trent Paulson
|style="font-size:88%"|1–0, 6–0
|style="font-size:88%" rowspan=5|February 1–4, 2012
|style="font-size:88%" rowspan=5|2012 Dave Schultz Memorial International
|style="text-align:left;font-size:88%;" rowspan=5| Colorado Springs, Colorado
|-
|Win
|29–1
|align=left| Tyler Caldwell
|style="font-size:88%"|1–0, 1–0
|-
|Win
|28–1
|align=left| Muzaffar Abdurakhmanov
|style="font-size:88%"|1–0, 5–0
|-
|Win
|27–1
|align=left| Carmelo Lumia
|style="font-size:88%"|Fall
|-
|Win
|26–1
|align=left| Kohei Kitamura
|style="font-size:88%"|1–0, 3–0
|-
! style=background:white colspan=7 |
|-
|Win
|25–1
|align=left| Yunierki Blanco
|style="font-size:88%"|3–2, 3–2
|style="font-size:88%" rowspan=3|October 20–24, 2011
|style="font-size:88%" rowspan=3|2011 Pan American Games
|style="text-align:left;font-size:88%;" rowspan=3| Guadalajara, Mexico
|-
|Win
|24–1
|align=left| Ricardo Roberty
|style="font-size:88%"|2–1, 1–1
|-
|Win
|23–1
|align=left| Jose Mercado
|style="font-size:88%"|7–0, 6–0
|-
! style=background:white colspan=7 |
|-
|Win
|22–1
|align=left| Sadegh Goudarzi
|style="font-size:88%"|3–2, 4–1
|style="font-size:88%" rowspan=5|September 12–18, 2011
|style="font-size:88%" rowspan=5|2011 World Wrestling Championships
|style="text-align:left;font-size:88%;" rowspan=5| Istanbul, Turkey
|-
|Win
|21–1
|align=left| Ashraf Aliyev
|style="font-size:88%"|0–2, 5–4, 3–0
|-
|Win
|20–1
|align=left| Ricardo Roberty
|style="font-size:88%"|2–1, 1–0
|-
|Win
|19–1
|align=left| Denis Tsargush
|style="font-size:88%"|1–3, 1–0, 2–1
|-
|Win
|18–1
|align=left| Dmytro Rochniak
|style="font-size:88%"|3–1, 4–2
|-
! style=background:white colspan=7 |
|-
|Win
|17–1
|align=left| Alibek Agbayev
|style="font-size:88%"|3–1, 6–0
|style="font-size:88%" rowspan=5|July 23–24, 2011
|style="font-size:88%" rowspan=5|2011 Ukrainian Memorial International
|style="text-align:left;font-size:88%;" rowspan=5| Kyiv, Ukraine
|-
|Win
|16–1
|align=left| Musa Murtazaliev
|style="font-size:88%"|1–0, 4–1
|-
|Win
|15–1
|align=left| Giya Chikhladze
|style="font-size:88%"|2–1, 5–0
|-
|Win
|14–1
|align=left| Zelim Perisayev
|style="font-size:88%"|3–1, 4–0
|-
|Win
|13–1
|align=left| Ilgiz Jakupbekov
|style="font-size:88%"|
|-
! style=background:white colspan=7 |
|-
|Win
|12–1
|align=left| Andrew Howe
|style="font-size:88%"|3–1, 1–0
|style="font-size:88%" rowspan=2|June 9–11, 2011
|style="font-size:88%" rowspan=2|2011 US World Team Trials
|style="text-align:left;font-size:88%;" rowspan=2| Oklahoma City, Oklahoma
|-
|Win
|11–1
|align=left| Andrew Howe
|style="font-size:88%"|1–0, 1–2, 3–2
|-
|Win
|10–1
|align=left| Aniuar Geduev
|style="font-size:88%"|1–0, 2–1
|style="font-size:88%"|May 5, 2011
|style="font-size:88%"|2011 Beat The Streets: USA vs. Russia
|style="text-align:left;font-size:88%;" |
 New York City, New York
|-
! style=background:white colspan=7 |
|-
|Win
|9–1
|align=left| Nick Marable
|style="font-size:88%"|0–3, 1–0, 3–0
|style="font-size:88%" rowspan=4|April 7–10, 2011
|style="font-size:88%" rowspan=4|2011 US Open Championships
|style="text-align:left;font-size:88%;" rowspan=4| Cleveland, Ohio
|-
|Win
|8–1
|align=left| Kirk White
|style="font-size:88%"|4–2, 3–2
|-
|Win
|7–1
|align=left| Lloyd Rogers
|style="font-size:88%"|3–0, 8–0
|-
|Win
|6–1
|align=left| Bobby Nash
|style="font-size:88%"|Fall
|-
! style=background:white colspan=7 |
|-
|Loss
|5–1
|align=left| Teyon Ware
|style="font-size:88%"|1–1, 0–1
|style="font-size:88%" rowspan=6|April 22, 2007
|style="font-size:88%" rowspan=6|2007 US University National Championships
|style="text-align:left;font-size:88%;" rowspan=6| Akron, Ohio
|-
|Win
|5–0
|align=left| Ryan Needle
|style="font-size:88%"|4–2, 3–2
|-
|Win
|4–0
|align=left| Nathaniel Holt
|style="font-size:88%"|TF 8–2, 6–0
|-
|Win
|3–0
|align=left| Ryan Williams
|style="font-size:88%"|4–3, 7–0
|-
|Win
|2–0
|align=left| David Christian
|style="font-size:88%"|9–1, 6–1
|-
|Win
|1–0
|align=left| Gabriel Mooney
|style="font-size:88%"|3–0, 3–0
|-

NCAA record 

! colspan="8"| NCAA Championships Matches
|-
!  Res.
!  Record
!  Opponent
!  Score
!  Date
!  Event
|-
! style=background:white colspan=6 |2011 NCAA Championships  at 165 lbs
|-
|Win
|15–3
|align=left|Tyler Caldwell
|style="font-size:88%"|MD 11–3
|style="font-size:88%" rowspan=4|March 17–19, 2011
|style="font-size:88%" rowspan=4|2011 NCAA Division I Wrestling Championships
|-
|Win
|14–3
|align=left|Colt Sponseller
|style="font-size:88%"|MD 14–6
|-
|Win
|13–3
|align=left|Scott Winston
|style="font-size:88%"|TF 23–8
|-
|Win
|12–3
|align=left|Ethan Headlee
|style="font-size:88%"|TF 23–7
|-
! style=background:white colspan=6 |2009 NCAA Championships  at 157 lbs
|-
|Win
|11–3
|align=left|Mike Poeta
|style="font-size:88%"|5–1
|style="font-size:88%" rowspan=5|March 19–21, 2009
|style="font-size:88%" rowspan=5|2009 NCAA Division I Wrestling Championships
|-
|Win
|10–3
|align=left|Gregor Gillespie
|style="font-size:88%"|MD 12–4
|-
|Win
|9–3
|align=left|Cyler Sanderson
|style="font-size:88%"|MD 14–6
|-
|Win
|8–3
|align=left|Colton Salazar
|style="font-size:88%"|Fall
|-
|Win
|7–3
|align=left|Hadley Harrison
|style="font-size:88%"|TF 23–7
|-
! style=background:white colspan=6 |2008 NCAA Championships  at 149 lbs
|-
|Win
|6–3
|align=left|Josh Churella
|style="font-size:88%"|4–2
|style="font-size:88%" rowspan=6|March 20–22, 2008
|style="font-size:88%" rowspan=6|2008 NCAA Division I Wrestling Championships
|-
|Win
|5–3
|align=left|J.P. O'Connor
|style="font-size:88%"|5–3
|-
|Loss
|4–3
|align=left|Brent Metcalf
|style="font-size:88%"|4–8
|-
|Win
|4–2
|align=left|Josh Churella
|style="font-size:88%"|3–2
|-
|Win
|3–2
|align=left| Ed McCray
|style="font-size:88%"|TF 21–5
|-
|Win
|2–2
|align=left|Cesar Grajales
|style="font-size:88%"|4–1
|-
! style=background:white colspan=6 |2007 NCAA Championships at 149 lbs
|-
|Loss
|1–2
|align=left|Matt Storniolo
|style="font-size:88%"|SV-4 1–6
|style="font-size:88%" rowspan=3|March 15–17, 2007
|style="font-size:88%" rowspan=3|2007 NCAA Division I Wrestling Championships
|-
|Win
|1–1
|align=left|Matt Dunn
|style="font-size:88%"|8–2
|-
|Loss
|0–1
|align=left|Dustin Schlatter
|style="font-size:88%"|2–3
|-

Awards and honors

2022
 Pan American Championships (79 kg)
2021
 World Wrestling Championships (79 kg)
2020
 Pan American Championships (74 kg)
2019
 World Wrestling Championships (74 kg)
 Pan American Games (74 kg)
 Pan American Championships (74 kg)
 Yasar Dogu (74 kg)
 Dan Kolov – Nikola Petrov Tournament (74 kg)
2018
 World Wrestling Championships (74 kg)
 Yasar Dogu (74 kg)
2017
 World Wrestling Championships (74 kg)
 Grand Prix of Spain (74 kg)
2016
 Pan American Championships (74 kg)
 Grand Prix of Germany (74 kg)
 Yasar Dogu (74 kg)
2015
 World Wrestling Championships (74 kg)
 Pan American Games (74 kg)
 Alexander Medved Prizes (74 kg)
2014
 World Wrestling Championships (74 kg)
 Pan American Championships (74 kg)
 Yasar Dogu (74 kg)
2013
 World Wrestling Championships (74 kg)
 Stepan Sargsyan Tournament (74 kg)
 Alexander Medved Prizes (74 kg)
2012
 Summer Olympics (74 kg)
 Cerro Pelado International (74 kg)
 Dave Schultz Memorial International (74 kg)
2011
 World Wrestling Championships (74 kg)
 Pan American Games (74 kg)
 International Ukrainian Tournament (74 kg)
Dan Hodge Trophy winner
 NCAA Division I (165 lbs)
 Big 12 Conference (165 lbs)
2009
 NCAA Division I (157 lbs)
 Big 12 Conference (157 lbs)
2008
 NCAA Division I (149 lbs)
 Big 12 Conference (149 lbs)

See also 
 List of World and Olympic Champions in men's freestyle wrestling
 United States results in men's freestyle wrestling

References

External links 
 Jordan Burroughs' Rokfin Channel
 

Living people
1988 births
Sportspeople from Camden, New Jersey
People from Winslow Township, New Jersey
Winslow Township High School alumni
Nebraska Cornhuskers wrestlers
Wrestlers at the 2011 Pan American Games
Wrestlers at the 2012 Summer Olympics
Wrestlers at the 2016 Summer Olympics
Olympic gold medalists for the United States in wrestling
Medalists at the 2012 Summer Olympics
American male sport wrestlers
World Wrestling Championships medalists
Pan American Games gold medalists for the United States
Pan American Games medalists in wrestling
Wrestlers at the 2015 Pan American Games
Wrestlers at the 2019 Pan American Games
Medalists at the 2011 Pan American Games
Medalists at the 2015 Pan American Games
Medalists at the 2019 Pan American Games
Pan American Wrestling Championships medalists
African-American sport wrestlers
World Wrestling Champions